The Cyprus Emergency, also known as the Greek Cypriot War of Independence or the Cypriot War of Independence, was a conflict fought in British Cyprus between November 1955 and March 1959.

The National Organisation of Cypriot Fighters (EOKA), a Greek Cypriot right-wing nationalist guerrilla organisation, began an armed campaign in support of the end of British colonial rule and the unification of Cyprus and Greece (Enosis) in 1955. Opposition to Enosis from Turkish Cypriots led to the formation of the Turkish Resistance Organisation (TMT) in support of the partition of Cyprus. The Cyprus Emergency ended in 1959 with the signature of the London-Zürich Agreements, establishing the Republic of Cyprus as a non-partitioned independent state separate from Greece.

Background
Cyprus was a territory of the Ottoman Empire from the late 16th century until it became a protectorate of the United Kingdom under nominal Ottoman suzerainty at the Cyprus Convention of 4 June 1878 after the Russo-Turkish War. In 1915, Cyprus was formally annexed into the British Empire after the Ottomans had entered World War I on the side of the Central Powers against the British, and it was initially governed by a military administration until 1925, when it was proclaimed the Crown Colony of Cyprus. From the 1910s to the 1950s, Greek Cypriots became increasingly dissatisfied with British rule and supportive of Enosis, the concept of political unification between Cyprus and Greece. Several unsuccessful offers made to Greece by the British to cede Cyprus in exchange for military concessions, as well as the noticeable lack of British investment on the island, caused a growing Cypriot nationalist movement.

In 1954, Britain announced its intention to transfer its Suez military headquarters (the office of the Commander-in-Chief, Middle East) to Cyprus.

Insurgency
On 1 April 1955, the EOKA started its insurgency with the 1 April Attacks. After a series of other incidents, the Governor General Sir John Harding declared a state of emergency on 26 November 1955. The British encountered great difficulty obtaining effective intelligence on EOKA, as it was supported by the majority of the Greek Cypriot population. They were also hampered by a drain on manpower, which was caused by the Suez Crisis and the Malayan Emergency, but towards the late 1950s, they enjoyed more success.

Counter-insurgency

Torture and extrajudicial killings 
At least 14 Cypriots (including a minor) arrested on suspicion of being EOKA members, were tortured then killed by U.K. forces during detention. Witnesses – both surviving detainees and U.K. veterans – recall various kinds of torture and inhumane treatment of detainees.

Subsequent events 
Cyprus became an independent republic in 1960 with Britain retaining control of two Sovereign Base Areas: at Akrotiri and Dhekelia.

In January 2019 the British government agreed to pay £1 million to a total of 33 Cypriots, who had been allegedly tortured by British forces during the uprising. They included a woman, aged 16 at the time, who said that she had been detained and repeatedly raped by soldiers, and a man who had lost a kidney as a result of his interrogation. The payout followed the declassification of government documents in 2012, but Foreign Minister Alan Duncan stated that "the settlement does not constitute any admission of liability" although "the government has settled the case in order to draw a line under this litigation and to avoid the further escalation of costs".

See also

 Palestine Emergency (1944–48)
 Malayan Emergency (1948–60)
 Kenyan Emergency (1952–60)
 Nyasaland Emergency (1958–60)
 Suez Crisis (1956)
 Independence of Malta (1964)

References

Bibliography

Further reading
 
 
 
 Durrell, Lawrence (1957), Bitter Lemons of Cyprus. London: Faber.

External links
 Cyprus Exhibit at National Army Museum
 Cyprus – Fighting the EOKA

 
EOKA
1955 in Cyprus
1956 in Cyprus
1957 in Cyprus
1958 in Cyprus
1959 in Cyprus